Pochinki is the name of several rural localities in USSR.
Pochinki is also the name of a city in PUBG's map Erangel, being one of the deadliest places in the map.

Ivanovo Oblast
As of 1815, two rural localities in Ivanovo Oblast bear this name:
Pochinki, Ivanovsky District, Ivanovo Oblast, a village in Ivanovsky District
Pochinki, Yuryevetsky District, Ivanovo Oblast, a village in Yuryevetsky District

Kaluga Oblast
As of 1815, one rural locality in Kaluga Oblast bears this name:
Pochinki, Kaluga Oblast, a village under the administrative jurisdiction of the city of Kaluga

Kostroma Oblast
As of 1815, one rural locality in Kostroma Oblast bears this name:
Pochinki, Kostroma Oblast, a village in Nezhitinskoye Settlement of Makaryevsky District

Republic of Mordovia
As of 1815, one rural locality in the Republic of Mordovia bears this name:
Pochinki, Republic of Mordovia, a selo in Pochinkovsky Selsoviet of Bolshebereznikovsky District

Moscow Oblast
As of 1815, ten rural localities in Moscow Oblast bear this name:
Pochinki, Mozhaysky District, Moscow Oblast, a village in Borisovskoye Rural Settlement of Mozhaysky District, Moscow Oblast
Pochinki, Noginsky District, Moscow Oblast, a village in Yamkinskoye Rural Settlement of Noginsky District
Pochinki, Podolsky District, Moscow Oblast, a village in Klenovskoye Rural Settlement of Podolsky District
Pochinki, Ramensky District, Moscow Oblast, a village in Ganusovskoye Rural Settlement of Ramensky District
Pochinki, Shakhovskoy District, Moscow Oblast, a village in Ramenskoye Rural Settlement of Shakhovskoy District
Pochinki, Shatursky District, Moscow Oblast, a village in Krivandinskoye Rural Settlement of Shatursky District
Pochinki, Solnechnogorsky District, Moscow Oblast, a village in Smirnovskoye Rural Settlement of Solnechnogorsky District
Pochinki, Semenovskoye Rural Settlement, Stupinsky District, Moscow Oblast, a village in Semenovskoye Rural Settlement of Stupinsky District
Pochinki, Stupino Town, Stupinsky District, Moscow Oblast, a village under the administrative jurisdiction of  the town of  Stupino, Stupinsky District
Pochinki, Yegoryevsky District, Moscow Oblast, a selo in Yurtsovskoye Rural Settlement of Yegoryevsky District

Nizhny Novgorod Oblast
As of 1815, four rural localities in Nizhny Novgorod Oblast bear this name:
Pochinki, Koverninsky District, Nizhny Novgorod Oblast, a village in Skorobogatovsky Selsoviet of Koverninsky District
Pochinki, Pochinkovsky District, Nizhny Novgorod Oblast, a selo in Pochinkovsky Selsoviet of Pochinkovsky District
Pochinki, Shatkovsky District, Nizhny Novgorod Oblast, a selo in Smirnovsky Selsoviet of Shatkovsky District
Pochinki, Voznesensky District, Nizhny Novgorod Oblast, a village in Kriushinsky Selsoviet of Voznesensky District

Novgorod Oblast
As of 1815, one rural locality in Novgorod Oblast bears this name:
Pochinki, Novgorod Oblast, a village in Belebelkovskoye Settlement of Poddorsky District

Perm Krai
As of 2010, one rural locality in Perm Krai bears this name:
Pochinki, Perm Krai, a village in Ordinsky District

Pskov Oblast
As of 1815, three rural localities in Pskov Oblast bear this name:
Pochinki, Kunyinsky District, Pskov Oblast, a village in Kunyinsky District
Pochinki, Loknyansky District, Pskov Oblast, a village in Loknyansky District
Pochinki, Novosokolnichesky District, Pskov Oblast, a village in Novosokolnichesky District

Smolensk Oblast
As of 1851, one rural locality in Smolensk Oblast bears this name:
Pochinki, Smolensk Oblast, a village in Dneprovskoye Rural Settlement of Novoduginsky District

Tula Oblast
As of 1841, two rural localities in Tula Oblast bear this name:
Pochinki, Griboyedovskaya Volost, Kurkinsky District, Tula Oblast, a village in Griboyedovskaya Volost of Kurkinsky District
Pochinki, Samarskaya Volost, Kurkinsky District, Tula Oblast, a village in Samarskaya Volost of Kurkinsky District

Tver Oblast
As of 1857, five rural localities in Tver Oblast bear this name:
Pochinki, Kalininsky District, Tver Oblast, a village in Kalininsky District
Pochinki, Kashinsky District, Tver Oblast, a village in Kashinsky District
Pochinki (Chertolino Rural Settlement), Rzhevsky District, Tver Oblast, a village in Rzhevsky District; municipally, a part of Chertolino Rural Settlement of that district
Pochinki (Pobeda Rural Settlement), Rzhevsky District, Tver Oblast, a village in Rzhevsky District; municipally, a part of Pobeda Rural Settlement of that district
Pochinki, Sandovsky District, Tver Oblast, a village in Sandovsky District

Udmurt Republic
As of 1875, one rural locality in the Udmurt Republic bears this name:
Pochinki, Udmurt Republic, a village in Yezhevsky Selsoviet of Yukamensky District

Vladimir Oblast
As of 1852, two rural localities in Vladimir Oblast bear this name:
Pochinki, Gorokhovetsky District, Vladimir Oblast, a village in Gorokhovetsky District
Pochinki, Gus-Khrustalny District, Vladimir Oblast, a village in Gus-Khrustalny District

Yaroslavl Oblast
As of 1832, six rural localities in Yaroslavl Oblast bear this name:
Pochinki, Bolsheselsky District, Yaroslavl Oblast, a village in Vysokovsky Rural Okrug of Bolsheselsky District
Pochinki, Nekouzsky District, Yaroslavl Oblast, a village in Rodionovsky Rural Okrug of Nekouzsky District
Pochinki, Pereslavsky District, Yaroslavl Oblast, a village in Zagoryevsky Rural Okrug of Pereslavsky District
Pochinki, Melenkovsky Rural Okrug, Yaroslavsky District, Yaroslavl Oblast, a village in Melenkovsky Rural Okrug of Yaroslavsky District
Pochinki, Ryutnevsky Rural Okrug, Yaroslavsky District, Yaroslavl Oblast, a village in Ryutnevsky Rural Okrug of Yaroslavsky District
Pochinki, Shirinsky Rural Okrug, Yaroslavsky District, Yaroslavl Oblast, a village in Shirinsky Rural Okrug of Yaroslavsky District